Danielle Harmsen (born 25 January 1986 in Velsen) is a retired Dutch tennis player.

She won five singles titles and 33 doubles titles on the ITF Circuit in her career. Harmsen retired from professional tennis 2013.
 
On 4 October 2010, she reached her highest WTA singles ranking of 406 whilst her best doubles ranking was 213 in September 2012.

ITF Circuit finals

Singles: 15 (5 titles, 10 runner-ups)

Doubles: 50 (33 titles, 17 runner-ups)

References

External links
 
 

1986 births
Living people
People from Velsen
Dutch female tennis players
Sportspeople from North Holland
20th-century Dutch women
21st-century Dutch women